Awakening is an album by American saxophonist Sonny Fortune recorded in 1975 and released on the Horizon label.

Reception

In The Village Voice, Robert Christgau said while Awakening featured nothing innovative, it did showcase Fortune's knack for "great synthesis", including "shades of hard bop and late-'50s Miles in a more modal setting, so lyrical and tough-minded that the 12-minute flute-and-congas thing (the title cut, wouldn't you know) becomes quite credible, even listenable." Vincent Thomas for AllMusic calls the album "an adequate set of mostly straight-ahead jazz, which sets it apart from many of his fusion-venturing peers of the '70s".

Track listing
All compositions by Sonny Fortune except where noted.
 "Triple Threat" (Rodgers Grant) - 10:27    
 "Nommo" (Jymie Merritt) - 9:38    
 "Sunshower" (Kenny Barron) - 5:14    
 "For Duke and Cannon" - 2:58    
 "Awakening" - 12:16

Personnel
Sonny Fortune - alto saxophone, flute, cowbell, chimes, claves, shaker, percussion
Charles Sullivan - trumpet, flugelhorn (tracks 1 & 5)
Kenny Barron - piano, electric piano (tracks 1-3 & 5)
John Hicks - piano (track 4)
Wayne Dockery (track 1 & 3-5), Reggie Workman (track 2) - bass
Billy Hart (tracks 1-3 & 5),  Chip Lyle (track 4) - drums
Angel Allende - congas, percussion (tracks 2 & 5)

References

Horizon Records albums
Sonny Fortune albums
1975 albums